John Carlton (6 July 1866 – 13 August 1945) was an Australian cricketer. He played 16 first-class cricket matches for Victoria between 1891 and 1897.

See also
 List of Victoria first-class cricketers

References

External links
 

1866 births
1945 deaths
Australian cricketers
Victoria cricketers
Queensland cricketers
People from Bacchus Marsh